Klasse 10 B is a Norwegian documentary series produced by Strix Television, which was first shown on NRK1 in spring 2010. The series is based on the Swedish concept, Klass 9a (:sv:Klass 9A). Filming began in spring 2009, and the premiere of episode 1 of 10 had 536,000 viewers.

The idea of the series was to put some of Norway's best teachers in a poor-performing school class, and try to make them one of the best classes in the country. During the spring semester, class 10b of Sten-Tærud skole in Skedsmo municipality were taken by nine hand-picked teachers.

Teachers

Prizes 

The series won the spring 2010 Gullruten in the category of best new program series. The series was also nominated in the category of best reality show.

References 

Skedsmo
NRK original programming